Ramsgate Airport was a civil airfield at Ramsgate, Kent, United Kingdom which opened in July 1935. It was briefly taken over by the Royal Air Force in the Second World War, becoming RAF Ramsgate. The airfield was then closed and obstructed to prevent its use. It reopened in 1953 and served until final closure in 1968. The site has now been redeveloped as an industrial estate.

History

1935–40
Ramsgate was selected to be the site of a Landing Ground during the First World War, but no work was carried out. Built at a cost of £26,000, Ramsgate Airport opened on 1 July 1935, on a  site. With the opening of the airport, Hillman's Airways inaugurated a service to Belgium. As Ostend Airport was not then ready, services were initially to Le Zoute Airfield, Knokke. Four services per day were operated.

The airport was operated for the local council by Ramsgate Airport Ltd, which was registered as a private limited company on 20 July 1935 with capital of £5,000 in £1 shares. The directors were a Mr F Gwatkin, Richard Seaman and Whitney Straight. Ramsgate Airport Ltd was a subsidiary of Whitney Straight's Straight Corporation as the first of what would become a chain of 12 airports.

The official opening ceremony was performed by the Mayor of Ramsgate, who was then flown to Belgium in a de Havilland Dragon by Neville Stack. A representative from Crilly Airways also attended the dinner to celebrate the opening of the airport. Customs facilities were provided within a month of the airport opening. In October 1935, plans were made to extend the airport, with a control tower and a hangar amongst the facilities to be provided.

In February 1936, the site measured . Fuel and customs facilities had been provided and a temporary hangar erected. By March 1936, the Thanet Aero Club had been formed as the Straight Corporation's replacement for Ramsgate Flying Club which had started in August 1934. The new club operated a de Havilland Hornet Moth. Mignet HM.14 "Flying Flea" aircraft had been grounded following a crash at Penshurst in May 1936, The ban had been lifted following wind tunnel tests which resulted in modifications to the wings. A race was held on 3 August in which seven aircraft took part, with a £100 prize at stake. An eighth aircraft was flown by Henri Mignet, who performed various aerobatics. The aircraft bore the inscription "Flying Flea flies in England. I thank the Air Ministry". Following the race, Short Scion aircraft flew pleasure flights. From 29 August – 26 September, an Aviation Camp was held at Ramsgate. It was sponsored by the National League of Airmen.

A tented holiday camp with its own clubhouse was set up on the airfield. For the 1936 and 1937 summer seasons it was called the Ramsgate Aviation Holiday Camp, and it was renamed the Ramsgate Flying Centre for the following two years. It offered guests free pleasure flights and a free flying lesson.

On 3 July 1937, the official opening of Ramsgate Airport was performed by Director-General of Civil Aviation Sir Francis Shelmerdine. The airport terminal/clubhouse was designed by art deco architect David Playdell-Bouverie and incorporated the control tower at its centre. From 17 to 31 July, 611 (West Lancashire) (Bomber) Squadron, Royal Air Force held a camp at Ramsgate. In August, an air race was held at Ramsgate. The race was won by Paul Elwell in Taylor Cub G-AESK. Alex Henshaw was third in Percival Mew Gull G-AEXF and Geoffrey de Havilland was seventh in De Havilland T.K.2 G-ADNO. Sixteen aircraft participated in the race. Thirteen of them were British, with two German and one Latvian entry.

At Easter 1938, a week-long aviation camp was held at Ramsgate. This was followed by another held from 4 June – 17 September. In July, Southern Airways Ltd, another Straight Corporation company, started a twice-daily service between Ilford, Essex and Ramsgate.

In April 1939, the annual aviation camp was organised by the Civil Air Guard. An intensive two-week course enabled pilots to obtain their "A" licence at a cost of £10 3s. In previous years it would have cost £25 13s to obtain an A licence.

In 1940, Ramsgate was used as a satellite of RAF Manston during the Battle of Britain. In August, during one of the many raids on Manston, Ramsgate was also attacked and the field cratered. With the need for Ramsgate as a satellite airfield diminishing following the end of the battle, the airfield was closed and obstructions placed on it to prevent its use. Post-war, the site was used for agricultural purposes.

1952–68

On 1 June 1952, Ramsgate Airport reopened. Air Kruise (Kent) Ltd had taken a 21-year lease on the land. They extended their Le Touquet – Lympne service to Ramsgate. The war-damaged buildings and hangars were repaired, and the main hangar was extended. A  grass runway was available, suitable to operate Avro Anson, de Havilland Dragon Rapide and de Havilland Heron aircraft. The first aircraft to land at Ramsgate was Auster J/1 Autocrat G-AIZZ. Early services from Ramsgate were operated by Dragon Rapides.

Ramsgate Airport was officially reopened on 27 June 1953 by Minister for Civil Aviation Alan Lennox-Boyd. The prototype Heron was amongst the aircraft that gave displays at the opening ceremony. A new flying club was formed, the Ramsgate Flying Club. Air Kruise moved its operations from Lympne to Ramsgate later that year. Air Kruise traded as Trans-Channel Airways. It carried 22,500 passengers in 1953.

On 1 May 1954, Air Kruise was taken over by Britavia, which also owned Aquila Airways and Silver City Airways, but kept its separate identity. In 1958, Air Kruise was absorbed into Silver City. Hugh Kennard, joint managing director of Silver City, formed Aircraft Engineering and Maintenance Ltd (AEM) at Ramsgate.The company overhauled aircraft engine gearboxes, hydraulic systems and instruments. As of 2011, AEM is known as Aviation Engineering & Maintenance Ltd and is a part of Rio Tinto Zinc. By 1960, AEM assembled the first Champion Tri-Traveller aircraft in the UK, G-APYT, at Ramsgate. Further Tri-Travellers were also assembled at Ramsgate.

In 1963, Chrisair were operating de Havilland Dragon G-ADDI from Ramsgate for pleasure flights. In March 1965, Kennard formed Invicta International Airlines, based at Manston Airport, but with a head office based at Ramsgate. Ramsgate Airport closed in 1968.

Accidents and incidents
On 5 August 1935, an aircraft operating a pleasure flight from Ramsgate suffered a broken oil pipe. A forced landing was made at Northwood, Thanet. The aircraft tipped on its nose when it ran through a fence but the five passengers were uninjured. The aircraft sustained minor damage.
on 24 August 1937, BAC Drone de Luxe G-AEEN stalled and crashed on approach to the airport, killing the sole occupant, David Holliday Jorge.
On 17 July 1938, a light aircraft belonging to Thanet Aero Club crashed into the sea off Cliftonville, killing both occupants. The pilot had been performing aerobatics over  when it entered a spin.
On 29 June 1957, de Havilland Dragon Rapide G-AGUF of Island Air Services, based at Ramsgate, crashed on take-off whilst operating a local pleasure flight. The aircraft was written off, but all on board escaped uninjured.
On 16 February 1967, Auster 5 G-AJAK of Thanet Flying Club failed to clear trees to the east of the runway, and was wrecked. There were no injuries.

References

Sources

Defunct airports in England
Airports in Kent
Ramsgate
1935 establishments in England
Airports established in 1935